The 2012 Cal Poly Mustangs football team represented California Polytechnic State University in the 2012 NCAA Division I FCS football season. The Mustangs were led by fourth-year head coach Tim Walsh and played their home games at Alex G. Spanos Stadium. This is their first year as a member of the Big Sky Conference. They finished the season 9–3, 7–1 in Big Sky play to claim a share of the conference championship with Eastern Washington and Montana State. They received an at-large bid into the FCS Playoffs where they lost in the second round to Sam Houston State.

Schedule

Despite also being a member of the Big Sky, the game against Eastern Washington on November 3 was considered a non conference game and had no effect on the Big Sky standings.

Game summaries

San Diego

@ Wyoming

UC Davis

@ North Dakota

@ Weber State

Northern Colorado

Portland State

@ Sacramento State

@ Eastern Washington

Idaho State

@ Northern Arizona

@ Sam Houston State–FCS Playoffs Second Round

References

Cal Poly
Cal Poly Mustangs football seasons
Big Sky Conference football champion seasons
Cal Poly
Cal Poly Mustangs football